Denny Field was located in Tuscaloosa, Alabama, and served as the home field for the University of Alabama football team from 1915 through the 1928 seasons, excluding 1918 when a team was not fielded due to World War I. The field was located at the intersection of 10th Street and 7th Avenue at the southern edge of the University of Alabama campus. At present, its former location is the site of portions of the new sorority row along Judy Bonner Drive and a parking lot.

The venue opened in 1915, and was originally named University Field. It was rededicated as Denny Field on October 9, 1920, prior to the third game of the 1920 season against Birmingham–Southern. Named in honor of former Alabama president George H. Denny, at that time official Denny Field signage was unveiled and it was noted that the name was selected due to Dr. Denny's continued support of the growth of the athletic program at Alabama.

During its tenure as the team's home field, Alabama amassed an overall record of 43 wins to only 2 losses. It was replaced by Denny Stadium, now known as Bryant–Denny Stadium, in 1929.

References

Defunct college football venues
Alabama Crimson Tide football venues
American football venues in Alabama
1915 establishments in Alabama
1928 disestablishments in Alabama
Sports venues completed in 1915